Cuerpo de élite is a Spanish comedy television series that originally aired on Antena 3 from 6 February 2018 to 8 May 2018. Consisting of an adaptation of the 2016 film of the same name, it was written by Adolfo Valor and Cristóbal Garrido and directed by Joaquín Mazón. It stars Octavi Pujades, Cristina Castaño, Canco Rodríguez, Adriana Torrebejano, Álvaro Fontalba, among others.

Premise 
Somewhat trying to move away from the heavy focus on regional stereotypes so embedded in the namesake film, even if the characters display different regional backgrounds, the comedy follows a heterogeneous elite group of  law enforcement officers at the service of the Spanish Ministry of the Interior coming from different units: a TEDAX, a Ertzaintza, a green beret, a mossa d'esquadra and a CNP agent.

Cast

Production and release 
Cuerpo de Élite consists of an adaptation to a television format of the  written by Adolfo Valor and Cristóbal Garrido and directed by Joaquín Mazón. Produced by Atresmedia Televisión in collaboration with MOD Producciones, both Mazón, Valor and Garrido returned in the same capacity (director and writers). Mar Olid joined Mazón at direction duties.

The series premiered on Antena 3 on 6 February 2018. The broadcast of the first episode earned a "magnificent" 24.6% share as well as 4,193,000 viewers. The broadcasting run wrapped on 8 May 2018 with a "good" 16.4% average audience share, even though the season finale only scored a 12.3% share (1,832,000 viewers). The series was cancelled by Antena 3 after one season.

References 

Television shows set in Spain
Spanish-language television shows
2018 Spanish television series debuts
2018 Spanish television series endings
2010s Spanish comedy television series
Antena 3 (Spanish TV channel) network series
Spanish police procedural television series
Television series by MOD Producciones